Pope Pius XIII may refer to:

 Lucian Pulvermacher, leader, until his death in 2009, of the "true Catholic Church", a small group in the United States
 In Foul Play, a 1978 comedy/thriller film, the fictional target of an assassination
 In The Young Pope, a 2016 miniseries, the titular protagonist

See also
 Pope Pius (disambiguation)